Grimsby power station supplied electricity to the town of Grimsby, England and the surrounded area from 1901 to the late 1960s. It was owned and operated by Grimsby Corporation prior to the nationalisation of the British electricity supply industry in 1948.  The power station was redeveloped in the 1920s and 1930s to meet the increased demand for electricity.

History
In 1894 Grimsby Corporation applied for a Provisional Order under the Electric Lighting Acts to generate and supply electricity to the town. This was granted by the Board of Trade and was confirmed by Parliament through the Electric Lighting Orders Confirmation (No. 2) Act 1894 (57 & 58 Vict. c. l). The power station was built in Moss Road Grimsby (53°33'47"N 0°04'57"W) and it first supplied electricity in 1901.

Equipment specification
The initial installation of plant in 1901 had a rating of 460 kW.

Plant in 1923
By 1923 the generating plant comprised:

 Coal-fired boilers generating up to 107,000 lb/h (13.5 kg/s) of steam which was supplied to:
 Generators:
 2 × 210 kW reciprocating engines DC
 2 × 500 kW reciprocating engines DC
 1 × 100 kW steam turbo-generators DC
 1 × 2,500 kW steam turbo-alternators AC

These machines gave a total generating capacity of 2,500 kW of alternating current plus 2,420 kW direct current.

Electricity supplies to consumers were 460 & 230 Volts DC.

Plant in 1924–39
New plant was commissioned in 1924, 1929, 1932 and 1939. This comprised:

 Boilers:
 2 × Clarke Chapman 70,000 lb/h (8.8 kg/s), steam conditions 250 psi and 700°F (17.2 bar, 371°C),
 3 × Clarke Chapman 95,000 lb/h (12.0 kg/s), steam conditions  250 psi and 755°F (17.2 bar, 402°C),

The boilers supplied steam to:

 Turbo-alternators:
 1 × 3 MW Metropolitan-Vickers turbo-alternator, generating at 6.6 kV
 2 × 10 MW Metropolitan-Vickers turbo-alternators, generating at 6.6 kV
 1 × 15 MW Brush-Ljungstrom turbo-alternator, generating at 6.6 kV.

The completed total installed generating capacity was 38 MW.

Condenser cooling water was cooled in three wood and three concrete cooling towers with a combined capacity of 2.47 million gallons per hour (3.12 m3/s). 

In 1960 internal combustion engines was installed at Grimsby power station with a capacity of 2.0 MW.

Operations

Operating data 1921–23
The operating data for the period 1921–23 was:

Under the terms of the Electricity (Supply) Act 1926 (16 & 17 Geo. 5 c. 51) the Central Electricity Board (CEB) was established in 1926. The CEB identified high efficiency ‘selected’ power stations that would supply electricity most effectively; Grimsby was able to improve its performance efficiency sufficiently to be designated a CEB selected station. The CEB also constructed the national grid (1927–33) to connect power stations within a region.

Operating data 1946
Grimsby power station operating data for 1946 is:

The British electricity supply industry was nationalised in 1948 under the provisions of the Electricity Act 1947 (10 & 11 Geo. 6 c. 54). The Grimsby electricity undertaking was abolished, ownership of Grimsby power station was vested in the British Electricity Authority, and subsequently the Central Electricity Authority and the Central Electricity Generating Board (CEGB). At the same time the electricity distribution and sales responsibilities of the Grimsby electricity undertaking were transferred to the Yorkshire Electricity Board (YEB).

Operating data 1954–67
Operating data for the period 1954–67 was:

The operating data for the internal combustion engines was:

Grimsby was an electricity supply district, covering 350 square miles (906 km2) of north Lincolnshire with a population of  171,000 in 1958. The number of consumers and electricity sold in the Grimsby district was:

Closure
Grimsby power station was decommissioned in the late 1960s. The buildings were subsequently demolished and the area has been redeveloped with industrial and commercial units.

See also
 Timeline of the UK electricity supply industry
 List of power stations in England

References

Coal-fired power stations in England
Demolished power stations in the United Kingdom
Former power stations in England
Buildings and structures in Grimsby